Run Silent, Run Deep is a 1958 American black-and-white war film starring Clark Gable and Burt Lancaster, based on the 1955 novel of the same name by Commander (later Captain) Edward L. Beach Jr. The picture was directed by Robert Wise and produced by Harold Hecht. The title refers to "silent running", a submarine stealth tactic. The story describes World War II submarine warfare in the Pacific Ocean, and deals with themes of vengeance, endurance, courage, loyalty, and honor and how these can be tested during wartime.

In addition to Gable and Lancaster playing the leads, the film also features Jack Warden and was the film debut of Don Rickles.

United Artists appropriately promoted Run Silent, Run Deep as a combination of the obsessiveness of Moby Dick'''s Captain Ahab and the shipboard rivalry found in Mutiny on the Bounty.

Although based on a novel of the same name, and having many of the same characters, the plot of the film diverges from that of the book. Captain Beach, the author of the book, did not think highly of the film; he later said that the film company bought only the book title and was not interested in producing an accurate depiction of the theme and plot of his novel.

Considering the star names involved, the film's box office reception was disappointing.
Plot

A World War II US Navy submarine officer, Commander P.J. Richardson (Clark Gable), is determined to get revenge on the Japanese destroyer Akikaze and its captain, nicknamed "Bungo Pete", who has sunk four US submarines in the Bungo Straits, including his previous command. He persuades the Navy Board to give him a new submarine command with the provision that his executive officer be someone who has just returned from active sea patrol. He single-mindedly trains the crew of his new boat, the USS Nerka, to return to the Bungo Straits and sink Bungo Pete, in spite of the Navy having expressly forbidden him from approaching the Bungo Straits on this mission. Richardson's executive officer, Lieutenant Jim Bledsoe (Burt Lancaster), is worried about the safety of his boat and his crew. He also resents Richardson and the Navy leadership for denying him command of the Nerka, which he believes should have been his.

Richardson begins to rigorously drill the crew on a rapid bow shot: Firing at the bow of an approaching ship, considered an act of desperation due to a vessel's extremely narrow profile. He then bypasses one target, only to take on a Japanese destroyer with a bow shot. The crew is outraged as it discovers that Richardson is avoiding legitimate targets in order to enter the Bungo Straits undetected in direct violation of his mission orders.

Finally, they come upon a large convoy. Soon after blowing up a cargo ship and then engaging Bungo Pete, they are attacked by aircraft that had been alerted to their presence and were waiting in ambush. They are forced to dive and barely survive depth charges. Three of the crew are killed, and Richardson suffers an incapacitating concussion. The submarine also narrowly dodges what the crew mistakenly believes is one of their own torpedoes doubling back on them. By sending up blankets, equipment, and the bodies of the dead, they convince the Japanese that the submarine has been sunk. Bledsoe uses Richardson's injury to assume command and set course for Pearl Harbor.

While listening to Tokyo Rose proclaiming the sinking of their boat, several crewmen are mystified about how the Japanese are able to identify several of them by name. Bledsoe realizes that the Japanese have analyzed their floating trash, so he decides to turn that to his advantage. Since the Japanese believe the Nerka has been sunk, he returns to the Bungo Straits to fight the Akikaze, which the submarine sinks with a bow shot, only to be attacked again by a mystery torpedo. Richardson deduces that the Akikaze was not working alone to sink US submarines, but was in concert with a Japanese submarine. He orders the boat into a dive just seconds before a Japanese torpedo races by.

After a brief underwater standoff, Bledsoe realizes that, with the Akikaze gone, the Japanese sub must defend its convoy; by attacking the convoy, the Nerka forces its adversary to surface, and destroys it by firing torpedoes under a shallow-draft ship. Richardson then collapses on the bridge, dies, and is buried at sea.

Adaptation from the novel

The film draws many plot elements from the novel, including Japanese gathering intelligence from the submarine's trash. One key difference is that the novel places Richardson ashore recovering from a battle injury and working on the torpedo exploder problem when Bledsoe takes out Richardson's boat and dies in the sinking of the USS Walrus.

In the novel the conflict between Richardson and Bledsoe begins at the start of the war while they are reconditioning the old  in the Naval Submarine Base New London and Richardson is compelled to disqualify Bledsoe for command of his own sub. The mutinous attitudes of the crew are an extension of Bledsoe's earlier rebelliousness, while the film provides them with no comparable context other than their loyalty to and respect for Bledsoe. Ensign Keith Leone, a sympathetic and loyal major character of the novel, is replaced by an unsympathetic and disloyal one who did not appear in the novel, Cartwright, to advance the conflict.

At Gable's insistence, the film has Richardson taken seriously ill before being relieved of command so Gable would not be perceived as playing a less than dominant character.

In the film, the submarine does not ram Japanese lifeboats to ensure that Bungo Pete is killed. The US Navy, which helped with the film's production, may have been concerned with reviving memories of a 1943 incident in which Dudley W. Morton fired on Japanese shipwreck survivors while commanding .

Cast

 Clark Gable as Commander P.J. "Rich" Richardson
 Burt Lancaster as Lieutenant Jim Bledsoe
 Jack Warden as Yeoman 1st Class "Kraut" Mueller
 Brad Dexter as Ensign Gerald Cartwright
 Don Rickles as Quartermaster 1st Class Ruby
 Nick Cravat as Russo
 Joe Maross as Chief Petty Officer Kohler
 Mary LaRoche as Laura Richardson
 Eddie Foy III as Larto
 Rudy Bond as Sonarman 1st Class Cullen

Production
The USS Redfish was used in many of the exterior scenes. This submarine had earlier portrayed the Nautilus in the Walt Disney film Twenty Thousand Leagues Under The Sea (1954) and made several appearances in the television series The Silent Service. She was scrapped in 1969. Rear Admiral Rob Roy McGregor, who had commanded two fleet boats (Grouper and Sea Cat) during World War II, acted as the technical advisor.

The actual Japanese destroyer Akikaze was lost with all hands while shielding the Japanese carrier Junyo from torpedoes launched by the submarine USS Pintado (SS-387) on November 1, 1944. She was stricken from the Navy list on January 10, 1945. The real USS Nerka (SS-380) was under construction during World War II, but construction was cancelled in July 1944.

Nick Cravat, who starred with Lancaster in nine films, had a speaking part. This was rare for him because his thick Brooklyn accent did not fit the historical dramas in which he often appeared.

Don Rickles made his film debut in a small role, and in his 2007 memoirs he recalled that during filming Gable would sometimes frustrate the filmmakers (including Lancaster, who was a financial investor in the film) by adhering to a strict 9-to-5 approach to the workday — he would reportedly stop working during the filming of major scenes. Later in his life, Lancaster publicly had nothing but praise and admiration for Gable, whom he described as a consummate professional.

The film contains several accurate depictions of torpedo attacks being arranged with periscope sightings, range and bearing calculations, and use of a Torpedo Data Computer to achieve a shooting solution. On the surface, the Captain uses a Target Bearing Transmitter mounted on the bridge to acquire a target visually and mark its bearing input for the shooting party inside the conning tower. This depicted the preferred tactic of night surface attack, taking advantage of both the submarine's greater speed and maneuverability using its diesel engines, and the use of its SJ radar in making accurate range and bearing calculations, although with greater risk of being sunk by bombs and shell fire. The director Robert Wise had real submariners working with the cast until they could realistically depict the complexities of these torpedo attacks. Submarine veterans of World War II who viewed the film remarked on the accuracy of these scenes and the scenes now provide modern-day audiences with a view of what life was like aboard World War II submarines.

The special effects were completed by using miniatures, considered to be state-of-the-art in 1957, when the film was made.

The US Navy and the production company staged a premiere for several journalists onboard the USS Perch, while she was "seven miles off Long Beach and 60 feet down".

Reception
Bosley Crowther, writing in The New York Times, called Run Silent, Run Deep'' "a straight tale of undersea adventure, all-male and all-submarine ... [that] has the hard, cold ring of truth", with "dangerous adventures [that] are severely, nail-bitingly tense" until "the ultimate showdown ... that keeps one forward on the chair." To the extent that the events depicted might appear hard to believe, he cited the credentials of the novel's author and noted that "they look more like the real thing in good old black-and-white."

One critic later summarized the plot after it had been replicated in other submarine films:

References

External links
 
 
 

 

1950s English-language films
1958 war films
1958 films
American black-and-white films
American films about revenge
American war films
Films about the United States Navy
Films about the United States Navy in World War II
Films based on American novels
Films based on military novels
Films directed by Robert Wise
Films produced by Burt Lancaster
Films produced by Harold Hecht
Films produced by James Hill
Films scored by Franz Waxman
Films with screenplays by John Gay (screenwriter)
Norma Productions films
Pacific War films
United Artists films
World War II submarine films
1950s American films